Allison Doerr is an American chemist and the editor in chief of Nature Methods.

Education 
Doerr has a bachelor's degree from Vassar College where she worked on polymer chemistry as well as a PhD in chemistry from Princeton University.

Career 
Doerr joined Nature Methods in 2005 and was promoted to editor in chief in 2018. She is the journal's specialist in biochemistry and chemical biology, including metabolomics, proteomics, and structural biology.

References

External links 

 Doerr's Twitter

Living people
21st-century American women scientists
American women chemists
Academic journal editors
Vassar College alumni
Princeton University alumni
Year of birth missing (living people)